
Gmina Horodło is a rural gmina (administrative district) in Hrubieszów County, Lublin Voivodeship, in eastern Poland, on the border with Ukraine.

The gmina contains part of the protected area called Strzelce Landscape Park.

Villages
Gmina Horodło contains the villages and settlements of Bereżnica, Cegielnia, Ciołki, Horodło, Hrebenne, Janki, Kobło-Kolonia, Kopyłów, Liski, Łuszków, Matcze, Poraj, Rogalin, and Zosin.

Neighbouring gminas
Gmina Horodło is bordered by the gminas of Białopole, Dubienka and Hrubieszów. It also borders Ukraine.

References

Polish official population figures 2006

Horodlo
Hrubieszów County